Zaleski State Forest is a state forest in the U.S. state of Ohio, located primarily in Vinton County, with areas in Athens County as well.  The 28,000 acre (110 km²) forest surrounds Lake Hope State Park in Vinton County, and borders the Waterloo Wildlife Research Station in Athens County.

Part of the Zaleski Mound Group, a group of Native American mounds built by the prehistoric Adena culture, is located within the forest.

The forest is located in the rugged hills of the unglaciated Allegheny Plateau in Southern Ohio, with elevations ranging up to about 1100 feet above sea level. The historic Hope Furnace can be seen at Lake Hope State Park, just across the road from the forest.

References

External links
 Ohio Dept. of Natural Resources: Zaleski State Forest
 U.S. Geological Survey Map at the U.S. Geological Survey Map Website. Retrieved November 14th, 2022.

Ohio state forests
Protected areas of Athens County, Ohio
Protected areas of Vinton County, Ohio
Allegheny Plateau